Rumble is a global online video sharing platform and cloud services business headquartered in Toronto, Ontario, with its U.S. headquarters in Longboat Key, Florida. It was founded in October 2013 by Chris Pavlovski, a Canadian technology entrepreneur. Rumble has more than 70 million active monthly users, and users post more than 8,000 hours of content daily.

The cloud services business hosts Truth Social, and the platform is popular mainly among the American right, but with also a growing market share in Australia, Canada, and the United Kingdom. The platform has been described as part of "alt-tech".

History 

Rumble was founded in 2013 by Chris Pavlovski as an alternative to YouTube for independent content creators. Pavlovski founded the platform after seeing that Google was prioritizing influencers on YouTube and not small content creators. In its early years, content on Rumble largely consisted of viral videos and news from mainstream media sources as well as videos of children and animals. The platform received a large influx of viewership beginning during the COVID-19 pandemic, with monthly visitors rising from 1.6 million in 2020 to 31.9 million by 2021. In the first nine months of 2021, Rumble generated more than $6.5 million in revenue, mostly from advertisements, but was not profitable.

Rise of viewership in 2020 has been attributed to Representative Devin Nunes, who accused YouTube of overly censoring his channel. Nunes began posting content on the platform with other prominent conservatives, such as Dinesh D'Souza, Dan Bongino, Sean Hannity, and Representative Jim Jordan, following soon after. On January 11, 2021, Rumble filed an antitrust lawsuit against Google over its search results, seeking damages exceeding $2 billion. Rumble alleged that Google manipulates its algorithm so as to favor Google's YouTube over Rumble in Google search results. It also alleges that this reduces its viewership and results in lower advertising revenues. As of August 2022, the case was ongoing.

Rumble received investment from venture capitalists Peter Thiel and J. D. Vance in May 2021, with that round of funding valuing Rumble at around $500 million. A month later, US President Donald Trump joined Rumble in preparation for recording his Ohio campaign rally. In October 2021, Rumble acquired Locals. On December 14, 2021, Trump Media & Technology Group (TMTG) announced that it entered a "wide-ranging technology and cloud services agreement" with Rumble in a statement which also stated that Rumble would operate part of Truth Social as well as TMTG.

In August 2022, Rumble announced plans to provide an online advertising platform known as Rumble Ads, with Truth Social as its first publisher. Rumble became a publicly traded company in September 2022, trading on NASDAQ, after merging with a special-purpose acquisition company.

Design and restrictions 

Rumble promotes itself as being "immune to cancel culture". Along with four other tabs in its main interface, Rumble features "recommended channels" to follow and an "Earnings" tab in its interface. Rumble also allows its users to generate revenue from their videos. Users upload videos that are licensed to Rumble's partners, such as Yahoo! and Microsoft News, after which money made from those videos is directly deposited into the Rumble account of the user.

The platform forbids pornography, harassment, racism, antisemitism, copyright infringement, and illegal content. Rumble's policies have drawn criticism from alt-tech platforms for not allowing anti-semitism and racism. Since November 2022, Rumble blocks access from French IP addresses, after the country's authorities demanded the site to remove Russian state media accounts, which Rumble refuses to comply.

Rumble has built its own cloud service infrastructure and video streaming capacity.

Users and content 

Rumble's video platform is popular among American right and far-right users, and has been described as part of "alt-tech" by various observers.

Using data from February 2021, researchers noted that several content creators have gained a receptive audience on Rumble after their productions have been pulled from YouTube or Facebook. They include Del Bigtree, Sherri Tenpenny, and Simone Gold. According to a June 2021 article from Slate, "Pavlovski has recently become more outspoken in accusing Big Tech of censorship and now actively courts prominent conservatives and intellectual dark web figures to join Rumble." It also hosts Truth Social Other channels on Rumble have included America's Funniest Home Videos, Jimmy Dore, Alex Jones of InfoWars, American broadcasting company E. W. Scripps Company, Truly, Hodgetwins, cable news channels Newsmax and One America News Network (OAN), Russian state-controlled international television network RT, and news agency organization Reuters. According to Reuters, Rumble is a customer of Reuters which pays to host the agency's content. In August 2021, Rumble announced deals with former Democratic Representative Tulsi Gabbard and The Intercept founder Glenn Greenwald to start posting their videos to the site.

As of August 15, 2022, Rumble reported 78 million monthly active users (MAU). That month, after being banned from most other platforms for hate speech and harmful conduct, kickboxer and social media personality Andrew Tate began posting on Rumble. Tate's move coincided with a significant increase in downloads of the Rumble app.

According to an August 2022 Reuters article, Rumble is a better-funded and more mainstream direct competitor to video-hosting site BitChute and Odysee, as all three include misinformation and conspiracy theories, with Rumble moderating more content. Unlike BitChute and Odysee, Rumble does suppress results when searching for some keywords associated with hate speech or extremism, although the content itself is still accessible.

See also 
 Comparison of video hosting services
 List of online video platforms

References

External links 

Alt-tech
Canadian entertainment websites
Companies listed on the Nasdaq
Internet properties established in 2013
Video hosting
Video on demand services